KCBU, VHF analog channel 3, was an independent television station licensed to Price, Utah, United States. The station was owned by Equity Media Holdings.

History

The station had a construction permit to increase the power of the digital signal to 4 kilowatts and was to have moved its transmitter to a peak south of Springville, Utah. This would have effectively given the station signal reach into the Salt Lake City market it was a part of. When the construction permit was approved, KCBU was to broadcast on digital channel 11.

The station's license was applied in 2003; the station was planned to become an affiliate of Más Música (now known as MTV Tres). However, this never materialized, and instead on October 24 of the same year, the station signed on as KUTF, Utah's original TeleFutura affiliate, as a Spanish-language television station; up until this point, the network was previously unavailable in the market.

The station briefly changed its call sign to KCBU on March 31, 2005; however, the station remained a TeleFutura affiliate, and the station's call sign was changed back to KUTF shortly after on April 29. On July 8, 2005, the station dropped the TeleFutura affiliation to become an affiliate of the Retro Television Network, and the station's call sign was officially changed to KCBU that day.

On January 4, 2009, a contract conflict between Equity Media Holdings Corporation and RTV interrupted the programming on many RTV affiliates. As a result, Luken moved RTV operations to its headquarters in Chattanooga, Tennessee, and dropped all Equity-owned affiliates, including KCBU. RTV remained available in Utah on KUSG in St. George until later in 2009, when that station switched to This TV; RTV has since affiliated with KCSG.

KCBU was sold at auction to the Daystar Television Network on April 16, 2009, indicating another programming change.  The station ceased analog operations on June 12, 2009, and never completed its digital facilities under Daystar, resulting in the cancellation of its license on July 6, 2010. Daystar concentrated on getting KUTF (channel 12) in Logan back on the air rather than KCBU.

References

External links

Equity Media Holdings
Defunct television stations in the United States
Television channels and stations established in 2003
2003 establishments in Utah
Television channels and stations disestablished in 2009
2009 disestablishments in Utah
CBU
CBU